Richard Franklin Bensel (born  1949) is a professor of American politics at Cornell University. Bensel has attempted to bridge the gap between American economic and political history, with an eye toward comparative implications. Bensel is best known as a scholar of political economy. His most recent work, Passions and Preferences: William Jennings Bryan and the 1896 Democratic National Convention (Cambridge University Press, 2008), attempts to bring American political development into a conversation with rational choice theory.

American political development 
Along with Stephen Skowronek, Theda Skocpol and others, Bensel is among the founders of the academic study of American political development (APD), a sub-specialty within the discipline of political science. Beginning during the 1970s and 80s as an attempt to "bring the state back in" to the study of American Politics, APD soon emerged as a competitor to the prevailing rational choice and survey research modes of studying American politics. In an important 2003 exchange published in Studies in American Political Development, John Gerring, Stephen Skowronek, Rogers Smith, and Bensel offered their thoughts on the state of APD as a subfield. Bensel controversially defined APD as "an insurgency." Its goal, he argued, "should be to destroy disciplinary boundaries, to sabotage reifying conventions, to identify and support intellectual rebellions wherever they appear, and to do our best to make sense of whatever space we may have cleared and claimed for ourselves."

Books 
 Sectionalism and American Political Development (1984)
 Yankee Leviathan: The Origins of Central State Authority in America, 1859–1877 (1991)
 The Political Economy of American Industrialization (2000)
 The American Ballot Box in the Mid-Nineteenth Century (2004)
 Passions and Preferences: William Jennings Bryan and the 1896 Democratic National Convention (2008)

References 

1949 births
Living people
Cornell University faculty
American political scientists